Obrataň is a municipality and village in Pelhřimov District in the Vysočina Region of the Czech Republic. It has about 800 inhabitants.

Administrative parts
Villages and hamlets of Bezděčín, Hrobská Zahrádka, Moudrov, Šimpach, Sudkův Důl, Údolí and Vintířov are administrative parts of Obrataň.

Transport
Obrataň is connected with Jindřichův Hradec by a narrow-gauge railway. It is operated by Jindřichohradecké místní dráhy company. It serves mostly as a tourist attraction.

References

Villages in Pelhřimov District